"Your Cheatin' Heart" is a 1952 song by the American country music singer Hank Williams.

Your Cheatin' Heart may also refer to:

 Your Cheatin' Heart (Freddy Fender album), 1976
 Your Cheatin' Heart (Hank Williams, Jr. album), 1964
 Your Cheatin' Heart (film), a 1964 musical directed by Gene Nelson
 Your Cheatin' Heart (TV series), 1990 BBC TV series by John Byrne
 Episode one of the first series of Disney Channel sitcom Phil of the Future